Springwood railway station is a heritage-listed former railway bridge and now railway station located on the Main Western line in Springwood, City of Blue Mountains, New South Wales, Australia. It was designed by NSW Government Railways and built from 1883 to 1884 by John White, Chas. & Wm. Coghill & Thos. Proull. It is also known as Springwood Railway Station Group. The property was added to the New South Wales State Heritage Register on 2 April 1999. The station opened on 11 July 1867. It previously had a passing loop to the east of Platform 1.

History 
When the first railway line over the Blue Mountains was constructed in 1867 under the direction of John Whitton, a station at Springwood was opened. This location has been an important railway station for over 140 years, with several trains to and from Sydney starting and terminating here. The present brick main station building was constructed in 1884, at the same time as stations were built at Wentworth Falls and Lawson.

In the 1880s, the Blue Mountains started to become a popular holiday destination and this was reflected in the provision of new, brick platform structures to replace the initial timber buildings. Springwood received in 1886 the finest building on the Blue Mountains, apart from Mount Victoria. It was also a rare example of local, official involvement in the building design, with the District Engineer, Fred Avery, approving the architectural details.

A gate keepers cottage was located west of the station building (now privately owned) and is not part of this listing. Bathurst Road crossed the railway line on the western side of the station and the resident gatekeeper was responsible for manning the gates at the level crossing. A footbridge provided pedestrian access across the line. With only one line across the mountains at this stage, the station building faced north to the line and to the crossing loops that were then in place on the north side of the main line.

The railway line over the Blue Mountains was duplicated in 1902 necessitating alterations to most of the platforms on that line. In most cases a new station was built, but in the case of Springwood Railway Station, a new platform wall was built on the south side of the main station building and alterations to the main station building were undertaken to provide a shelter on that side of the station. This was probably when the building was also extended one bay to the east. The level crossing was replaced by a subway and the residence to the west of the railway station was removed to make way for the footbridge which provided access from the north and south sides of the station to the platform. A men's toilet block was built to the east of the main station building. It is not clear whether the footbridge was a modification of the earlier footbridge or a new construction.

A signal box was opened in 1935 within the building envelope. In 1995 the room in which the interlocking frame is situated was changed.

From the 1940s onward, Springwood was an important watering station for steam locomotives proceeding to Sydney. Whilst taking on water there, however, it was extremely difficult for locomotives to be positioned in the necessarily precise location because of the falling gradient.

Few changes were made to the station between 1902 and 1997. In 1998, station upgrading works were undertaken including the construction of a subway to provide pedestrian access from the north and south to the platform, replacing the 1902 footbridge, a lift between the subway and the main station building, and a new canopy over the west end of the platform to provide shelter to the subway and platform.

Pedestrian access to the station is via a staircase, or elevator for the disabled, that connects to an underpass tunnel that connects to Macquarie Road to the south-east, and the station's multi-story parking structure to the north-west. The underpass is a relatively recent modification to the station, added in the late 1990s. Previously, station access was via an overpass bridge that likewise doubled as both access to the station and as a rail crossing.

Platforms and services
Springwood has one island platform with two sides. It is serviced by NSW TrainLink Blue Mountains Line services travelling from Sydney Central to Lithgow with 2 evening services to Bathurst. Some services from Sydney terminate at Springwood. One late night westbound service each day departs from platform 1, in order to perform a points cleaning move, which ensures both sets of points near the station are in working order.

Description 
The complex includes a type 3 second-class station building, built in 1884; with a signal box, completed in 1935; and a brick lavatory building (male toilet), completed in 1944. Other structures include a face brick island platform, completed in 1884 and 1902; and a pedestrian subway, completed in 1997–8.

Station building
External: Constructed (1884) of face brick with corrugated steel roof which extends on both sides to form an awning over both platforms. The Springwood station building is an early second class single storey island building in the Victorian Carpenter Gothic style. The extension at the east end of the building, breaking the symmetry, has a hipped roof behind the parapet. Two chimneys on the ridgeline of the main roof are rendered with wide rendered and moulded corbels. The existing chimney pots are not original. The walls of the original building are Flemish bond tuckpointed brickwork with sandstone capping to the parapets and sandstone quoins to the external corners and reveals to openings. An arch on the centre of the original parapets has a stone infill carved with "ERECTED 1884". Sandstone finials top the gables and bull's-eye vents in the gables are edged with sandstone. The east extension of the building is in stretcher bond brickwork but is finished with sandstone detailing matching the original construction. The brickwork has been painted. The building has three panelled doors with fanlights and dentilated transoms. Doors to the centre of the building are similar but have two panels. Windows are double hung and finished with sandstone label moulds. The original wide awning on the north side of the building is supported on timber stop chamfered columns with capitals and pattern carved on the centre of the columns. Cast iron brackets provide further embellishment to the columns. Awnings on the south side of the building are typical of the 1902 railway stations in the Blue Mountains with a wide low pitched roof supported on steel brackets supported on stone corbels. The ends of both awnings are finished with a timber boarded valance. A train mural by artist Vernon Treweeke is located on the eastern side of the main station building covering the privacy wall to the male toilet. Other murals by the same artist are located at Katoomba and Woodford Railway Stations.

Internal: The building appears to have maintained few of its original detailing and finishes due to the upgrade works of 1997–98. However, the original floor layout including a waiting room, ticket office, parcels office and signal box and ladies room are still present in addition to early double panelled timber framed windows and timber doors. Light fittings and carpet finish are relatively new. The 1902 extension to the southern side of the building is clearly apparent forming a corridor along the building. The 1935 signal box within the station building's envelope survives with its signage and no longer operates (lever frame and CTC panel removed). It is currently a storage room with exposed roof structure and painted brick walls.

Lavatory building
External: A simple gabled building (1944, 1998) on axis with the platform with a clearstory ventilated roof. The roof is of corrugated steel with exposed purlins to the gable ends and exposed rafters. The walls are Flemish bond tuckpointed brick work. Entry is at east end through an arched door behind a brick screen with the Mural on the outer side. Windows in the north wall have stone sills.

Internal: All toilet and light fittings date to 1998 upgrade works with painted brick walls and fibrocement ceiling panels.

Island platform
Springwood Railway Station has an island platform (1902) in a curved shape towards the east. The platform is brick faced with concrete deck and asphalt finish. A small square portion of grass has been inlayed into the platform surrounded by concrete west of the lavatories. A few potted plants are located on the north side of the platform under the station building awning, near the booking office and either side of the station level lift entrance. No garden beds are present. Entrance to the subway is located at the east end of the platform between the lift and station building. Period and modern light fittings and timber bench seating in addition to modern and early signage, aluminium palisade fencing between the station building and the lavatories and at both ends of the platform.

Pedestrian subway
The pedestrian subway (1997–1998) is marked by a long gabled corrugated roof on the Macquarie Road footpath and a low pitched gabled roof over the west end of the platform with cantilevered awnings connected to the awnings of the main station building. The walkway is most prominent from the western Macquarie Road approaches to the station than from the more eastern approaches. Access to the platform is via a ramped access way from both sides of the subway towards a central stairway on the west side of the subway and a lift at the east wall. The internal walls of the subway are tiled from floor to ceiling. The station is a prominent element in the Macquarie Road streetscape, overlooking a bend in the road making it a local landmark.

Moveable items
 A Milners' Patent safe (no number) has been observed at the station office.
 Several original station signage depicting " Station Master", "Waiting Room", "Booking Office", "Parcels Office", "Signal Box" etc.
 2 x commemorative plaques (1984 & 1998) on Platform 1 elevation of the station building.
 Early light fittings on platform

Landscape features
A brick 1902 retaining wall runs along the edge of the Macquarie Road footpath, elevating the railway line and platform from the street.

Condition 

As at 10 September 2008, the station building was generally in good condition. Also in good condition were the lavatory building, the island platform and the pedestrian Subway. The station group has a high degree of integrity with minimal changes to the exterior of the buildings. The overall integrity of the station has been reduced due to the 1990s upgrade works, which obscure views to the roofscape of the building and impact on the setting.

Modifications and dates 
1902 – Extension to the southern side of the building and the platform during duplication of the line
1944 – Extension to the main station building at Sydney end
1997–98 – Pedestrian Subway with lift and modern canopies constructed

Further information 

Small fibro shed adjacent to yard is excluded from listing.

Transport links
Blue Mountains Transit operate 10 routes via Springwood station:
685H: to Hazelbrook
690C: to Champman Parade
690P: Faulconbridge to Penrith station
690K: to Katoomba
692W: to Winmalee
692B: to Springwood Hospital
692H: to Hawkesbury Heights
692Y: to Yellow Rock
693: to Burns Road
694: to Bee Farm Road

Heritage listing 
Springwood Railway Station Group is of state significance as an important railway station for over 140 years with several trains to and from Sydney starting and terminating here. The main station building is the second oldest surviving station building in the Blue Mountains and is an unusual example of a Victorian Gothic railway station building. It is one of three stations in the Blue Mountains upgraded in 1880s demonstrating increase of tourism activity (the others being Lawson and Wentworth Falls) and is the only station building surviving from this period. Modifications to the building resulting from the duplication of the railway line in 1902 retained the elegant Victorian Gothic character of the station. With the intact lavatory building it is an important element in the chain of railway stations across the Blue Mountains. The size of the main station building and its solid well detailed construction suggests the growing importance of the village of Springwood in the 1880s. Springwood Railway Station Group is important to the local townscape forming a landmark at the curve in Macquarie Road towards the western end of the shopping centre.

Springwood railway station was listed on the New South Wales State Heritage Register on 2 April 1999 having satisfied the following criteria.

The place is important in demonstrating the course, or pattern, of cultural or natural history in New South Wales.

Springwood Railway Station is of historical significance as an important railway station for over 140 years with several trains to and from Sydney starting and terminating here. The main station building is the second oldest surviving station building in the Blue Mountains. It is one of three stations in the Blue Mountains upgraded in 1880s (the others being Lawson and Wentworth Falls) and is the only station building surviving from this period. The size of the main station building and its solid well detailed construction suggests the growing importance of the village of Springwood in the 1880s.

The place has a strong or special association with a person, or group of persons, of importance of cultural or natural history of New South Wales's history.

Springwood Railway Station has historical associations with the District Engineer, Fred Avery, who was involved in the station's design and approved the architectural details. However, this association is considered to be of secondary significance.

The place is important in demonstrating aesthetic characteristics and/or a high degree of creative or technical achievement in New South Wales.

Springwood Railway Station is of aesthetic significance as an extant example of a railway station building in the Victorian Gothic style. The use of brickwork with sandstone detailing gives the building an elegant character, which was retained and further enhanced with the duplication of the railway line across the Blue Mountains in 1902. This character is continued in the men's lavatory block at the east end of the platform. The station group in particular the main building remains a landmark within the townscape of Springwood.

The place has a strong or special association with a particular community or cultural group in New South Wales for social, cultural or spiritual reasons.

The place has the potential to contribute to the local community's sense of place, and can provide a connection to the local community's past.

The place possesses uncommon, rare or endangered aspects of the cultural or natural history of New South Wales.

Springwood station building is a rare extant example of a railway station building in the Victorian Gothic style with upgrade works in the 1880s. Springwood station building is the only surviving building from this style as the other two station buildings from this era at Lawson and Wentworth Falls have been demolished.

The place is important in demonstrating the principal characteristics of a class of cultural or natural places/environments in New South Wales.

The main 1880s station building is classified as a "type 3" second-class station building and is one of approximately 40 other similar station buildings across NSW and has representative significance for demonstrating widespread 19th Century railway customs, activities and design in NSW.

Photo gallery

See also 

List of railways stations in New South Wales

References

Bibliography

Attribution

External links

Springwood station details Transport for New South Wales

Easy Access railway stations in New South Wales
Railway stations in Australia opened in 1867
Regional railway stations in New South Wales
Short-platform railway stations in New South Wales, 6 cars
New South Wales State Heritage Register
Springwood, New South Wales
Railway bridges in New South Wales
Articles incorporating text from the New South Wales State Heritage Register
John Whitton railway stations
Victorian Carpenter Gothic architecture in New South Wales
Transport in the Blue Mountains (New South Wales)
Main Western railway line, New South Wales